The Fortune Teller is a 1956 Greek comedy film directed by Alekos Sakellarios.

Cast 
 Georgia Vasileiadou - Kalliopi
 Mimis Fotopoulos - Spyros Tsardis
 Vasilis Avlonitis - Nikitas
 Smaroula Giouli - Kaiti Giavasi
 Eleni Zafeiriou - Anna Giavasi
 Periklis Christoforidis - Andreas Giavasis/Velliris
 Giorgos Damasiotis - drunkard
 Betty Moschona - rich lady 1
 Kostas Papachristos - police captain
 Nikos Fermas - pistaccio salesman
 Kostas Mentis - laundry customer
 Beata Asimakopoulou - rich lady 2

References

External links 

1956 comedy films
1956 films
Greek comedy films
Greek black-and-white films
1950s Greek-language films